Fidlar (stylized as FIDLAR), is the debut studio album by California skate punk band Fidlar, released on January 1, 2013, through Dine Alone Records in Canada; on January 22, 2013, through Mom + Pop Music in the US; and on February 1, 2013, through Wichita Recordings in the UK. The album peaked at No. 5 on Billboard magazine's Top Heatseekers chart.

Ahead of its official release, the album premiered on Pitchfork Media Advance streaming service.

Critical reception 

Ahead of its release, Fidlar was named as one of 2013's most anticipated releases by Time, The Huffington Post, Stereogum, and Consequence of Sound. At Metacritic, the album received an average score of 72 based on 27 critics, which indicates "generally favorable reviews".

Track listing

Personnel 
Fidlar

 Zac Carper – vocals, guitar
 Elvis Kuehn – vocals, lead guitar
 Max Kuehn – drums
 Brandon Schwartzel – bass guitar, vocals

Production

 Alice Baxley – photography
 Ryan Baxley – sleeve design
 Fidlar – recording, design, producer
Rob Schnapf – mixing
 Milo Ward – artwork

Charts

References 

2013 debut albums
Fidlar albums
Mom + Pop Music albums
Wichita Recordings albums
Albums produced by Rob Schnapf